Alber may refer to
 Alber (name)
 Alber, a term in the German school of fencing
Alber & Geiger, European government relations law firm

See also
Albers